The 13th Army Corps was a corps of the Imperial Russian Army, formed in the 1870s. The corps fought in the Russo-Turkish War and World War I, and was disbanded with the collapse of the Imperial Russian Army after the Russian Revolution. During peacetime, it was stationed in the Moscow Military District.

History 
The corps was formed on 19 February 1877 in the Moscow Military District. Its headquarters was located at Smolensk before World War I. The corps fought in World War I. It was destroyed in East Prussia in late 1917 or early 1918.

Organization
On 18 July 1914, the corps included the following units.
1st Infantry Division (Russian Empire)
1st Brigade
1st Neva Infantry Regiment
2nd Sofia Infantry Regiment
2nd Brigade
3rd Narva Infantry Regiment
4th Kopore Infantry Regiment
1st Artillery Brigade
36th Infantry Division (Russian Empire)
1st Brigade
141st Mozhaysk Infantry Regiment
142nd Zvenigorod Infantry Regiment
2nd Brigade
143rd Dorogobuzh Infantry Regiment
144th Kashira Infantry Regiment
2nd Cavalry Brigade
17th Separate Chernigov Hussars Regiment
18th Separate Nizhyn Hussars Regiment
13th Mortar Artillery Division
5th Heavy Artillery Battalion
13th Sapper Battalion

Subordination
 2nd Army (from 2 August 1914)
 12th Army (15 January – 1 May 1916)
 1st Army (21 June – 17 July 1916)
 12th Army (1 August – 11 November 1916)
 5th Army (15 September – 16 July 1917)
 12th Army (to December 1917)

Commanders
Pavel Plehve: 1905-1906
Alexei Evert: 1908-1912
Mikhail Alekseyev: 1912-1914
Lieutenant General Nikolai Klyuev (July – August 1914)
Lieutenant General Polikarp Kuznetsov (January 1916 – September 1917)
Major General Pavel Adzhiyev (September–October 1917)
Lieutenant General Anton Symon (October 1917)

References

Citations

Bibliography 
 

Corps of the Russian Empire